The United States government established planning organizations to provide for the coordination of land use, transportation and infrastructure. These Metropolitan Planning Organizations (MPO) may exist as a separate, independent organization or they may be administered by a city, county, regional planning organization, highway commission or other government organization. Each MPO has its own structure and governance. The following is a list of the current federally designated MPOs.

List of metropolitan planning organizations

See also
 Metropolitan planning organization
 Conurbation
 Land-use planning
 Regional planning
 Zoning

External Links

 "Metropolitan Planning Organizations" (last updated July 29, 2021). USDOT — Bureau of Transportation Statistics — ArcGIS Online — https://data-usdot.opendata.arcgis.com/datasets/metropolitan-planning-organizations/explore("The Metropolitan Planning Organizations dataset is June 12, 2018, and is part of the U.S. Department of Transportation (USDOT)/Bureau of Transportation Statistics's (BTS's) National Transportation Atlas Database (NTAD). The United States Metropolitan Planning Organizations dataset is a geographic dataset of Metropolitan Planning Organizations political boundaries. These data provide users with information about the locations, names and sizes of Metropolitan Planning Organizations and is intended for use primarily with national planning applications.")

References

Urban planning
Transportation planning
Metropolitan planning organizations